Gosford Park is a 2001 satirical black comedy mystery film directed by Robert Altman and written by Julian Fellowes. It was influenced by Jean Renoir's French classic La Règle du jeu (The Rules of the Game).

The film stars an  ensemble cast, which includes Eileen Atkins, Bob Balaban, Alan Bates, Charles Dance, Stephen Fry, Michael Gambon, Richard E. Grant, Derek Jacobi, Kelly Macdonald, Helen Mirren, Jeremy Northam, Clive Owen, Ryan Phillippe, Maggie Smith, Kristin Scott Thomas, and Emily Watson. The story follows a party of wealthy Britons plus an American producer, and their servants, who gather for a shooting weekend at Gosford Park, an English country house. A murder occurs after a dinner party, and the film goes on to present the subsequent investigation from the servants' and guests' perspectives.

Development on Gosford Park began in 1999, when Bob Balaban asked Altman if they could develop a film together. Balaban suggested an Agatha Christie-style whodunit and introduced Altman to Julian Fellowes, with whom Balaban had been working on a different project.  The film went into production in March 2001, and began filming at Shepperton Studios with a production budget of $19.8 million. Gosford Park premiered on 7 November 2001 at the London Film Festival. It received a limited release across cinemas in the United States in December 2001, before being widely released in January 2002 by USA Films. It was released in February 2002 in the United Kingdom.

The film was successful at the box office, grossing over $87 million in cinemas worldwide, making it Altman's second-most successful film after M*A*S*H. Widely acclaimed by critics, Gosford Park was nominated for seven Academy Awards, including Best Picture, Best Director and Best Supporting Actress for both Mirren and Smith, and won Best Original Screenplay; it was also nominated for nine British Academy Film Awards, winning two.

The TV series Downton Abbey – written and created by Fellowes – was originally planned as a spin-off of Gosford Park, but instead was developed as a standalone property inspired by the film, and set earlier in the 20th century (from 1912 to the mid-1920s).

Plot

In November 1932, wealthy English industrialist Sir William McCordle, his wife Lady Sylvia, and their daughter Isobel host a weekend shooting party at their country estate, Gosford Park. The guests arrive: Sylvia's sisters Louisa and Lavinia, and their husbands Lord (Raymond) Stockbridge and Commander Anthony Meredith; her aunt Constance, Countess of Trentham; the Hon. Freddie and Mabel Nesbitt; actor Ivor Novello and American film producer Morris Weissman; and latecomers Lord Rupert Standish and Jeremy Blond. Mrs Wilson, the housekeeper, assigns the visiting servants to their rooms and takes notice of Robert Parks, Lord Stockbridge's valet, who mentions being raised in an orphanage. Head housemaid Elsie guides the inexperienced Mary MacEachran, new maid to Lady Trentham, through the gathering.

Following dinner, a silver carving knife turns up missing after an inventory count by the kitchen staff. Henry Denton, Weissman's valet, raises the staff's suspicions with intrusive questions at the staff’s group supper. Henry then attends to Weissman in his room, and Weissman asks Henry if he’ll visit him later in the evening and Henry replies that the risk doesn’t seem worth it, heavily implying a sexual relationship between the two. Later that evening Henry has a late-night sexual encounter with Lady Sylvia under the guise of bringing her some hot milk. Isobel asks Elsie to speak to Sir William about hiring Freddie, who is blackmailing Isobel over their affair and her aborted pregnancy. Freddie mistreats Mabel, whom he married for her money when he overestimated her wealth, while Rupert courts Isobel. Lady Trentham confides to Mary that Sylvia and Louisa cut cards to decide which of them would marry Sir William, whose fortune, earned in business and thus despised by these aristocrats, was nonetheless necessary to sustain their father, an earl, and themselves.  When the men go pheasant shooting the next morning, a stray shot grazes Sir William's ear. The ladies join them for lunch, and Sir William withdraws from Meredith's business scheme, leaving the commander financially ruined.

Lady Sylvia informs her aunt Constance that Sir William may halt her allowance, on which the grand lady is entirely dependent. During dinner, Lady Sylvia berates Sir William and Elsie comes to his defence, inadvertently exposing their affair; Elsie leaves the room disgraced while Sir William abruptly exits to the library. Mrs Wilson brings him coffee which he knocks away onto the floor and orders her to leave the mess, then demands whisky, which she calmly serves him despite his surly antagonistic manner. The guests gather in the drawing room as Novello plays the piano and sings, with the servants listening outside; Freddie, Anthony, Robert, and footman George each slip away. One of the men, seen only by his trousers, puts muddy big shoes—apparently waiting there to be cleaned after the shooting—over his own ones to pretend someone came from the outside, retrieves the missing knife and enters the library, where Sir William is slumped in his chair, and stabs him.

The body is soon discovered, and the bumbling Inspector Thompson and competent Constable Dexter arrive to investigate. Henry visits Lady Sylvia for another tryst, despite her husband having just been murdered ("I suppose life must go on," she sighs as she removes her earrings) and is revealed to be an American actor posing as Weissman's Scottish valet as research for an upcoming role in a Charlie Chan movie set in England, which Weissman is researching via this visit. It is discovered that Sir William was poisoned before being stabbed, and Mrs Croft, the head cook, tells her staff about Sir William's history of raping his female factory workers; those who became pregnant were forced to give their babies up for adoption, or else lose their jobs. Isobel gives Freddie a cheque, which he angrily tears up when confronted by Mabel. Inspector Thompson releases the guests without interviewing most of the staff.

Mary confronts Robert, deducing that he became Lord Stockbridge's valet to gain proximity to Sir William. Robert reveals that he is the illegitimate son of Sir William, who gave him to an orphanage two days after his birth, and that his mother, one of his factory workers, died soon after.  He tells her he did not poison Sir William, and she tells him he could not have killed him through stabbing him as he had already been poisoned to death. Robert, by this time, has already discovered that his murder attempt was actually merely stabbing a corpse. He grabs and kisses Mary, who leaves right after. As the guests and their servants depart, Freddie, his blackmail scheme of Isobel having failed, pursues a partnership with Anthony, whose business venture has ironically been saved by William's death. Isobel overhears Rupert callously dismissing his courtship of her when he hears the limits on her inheritance. The fired maid, Elsie, accepts a ride to London with Weissman, Novello, and Henry.

Lady Trentham and Lady Sylvia discuss Mrs Croft and Mrs Wilson's long-standing feud, leading Mary to realize Mrs Wilson is Robert's mother. She confronts Mrs Wilson, who reveals that she and Mrs Croft are sisters. They both had children fathered by Sir William while working at his factory; Mrs Croft kept her baby and lost her job, though the child died in infancy, while Mrs Wilson gave Robert up. Realizing he was her son and that he intended to kill his father, Mrs Wilson poisoned Sir William to ensure Robert's only crime would be stabbing a dead body. Mrs Croft comforts the heartbroken Mrs Wilson as Mary says goodbye to Robert, saying nothing about his mother or the murder, and the last guests go their separate ways.

Characters and cast

Above stairs
 Michael Gambon as Sir William McCordle, a wealthy industrialist and baronet, who owned two factories in Isleworth and two in Twickenham; most of the employees were working class women.
 Kristin Scott Thomas as Lady Sylvia McCordle, Sir William's wife, daughter of the Earl of Carton, an old but impoverished family.
 Camilla Rutherford as Isobel McCordle, daughter of Sir William and Lady Sylvia.
 Maggie Smith as Constance, Dowager Countess of Trentham, Lady Sylvia's aunt.
 Charles Dance as Raymond, Lord Stockbridge, Lady Sylvia's brother-in-law who is a baron and married to Louisa.
 Geraldine Somerville as Louisa, Lady Stockbridge, Lady Sylvia's younger sister.
 Tom Hollander as Lt. Commander Anthony Meredith, is broke and desperate, and married to Lavinia.
 Natasha Wightman as Lady Lavinia Meredith, Lady Sylvia's youngest sister.
 James Wilby as the Hon. Freddie Nesbitt, a late invitee who is also son of a baron and recently unemployed.
 Claudie Blakley as the Hon. Mabel Nesbitt, daughter of a glove factory owner, grew up in Leicester, and married to Freddie, who only married her believing her to be wealthy.
 Jeremy Northam as Ivor Novello, Sir William's cousin who is also a British matinee idol and film star.
 Bob Balaban as Morris Weissman, American film director, friend of Ivor Novello.
 Laurence Fox as Lord Rupert Standish, Isobel's boyfriend, and penniless younger son of a marquess.
 Trent Ford as Jeremy Blond, friend of Lord Rupert.

Below stairs
 Kelly Macdonald as Mary Maceachran, lady's maid to Countess of Trentham.
 Clive Owen as Robert Parks, Lord Stockbridge's valet, grew up in an orphanage in Isleworth, London, worked for Earl of Flintshire as a footman previously.  
 Helen Mirren as Mrs Wilson, housekeeper.
 Eileen Atkins as Mrs Croft, the cook.
 Alan Bates as Mr Jennings, butler. 
 Emily Watson as Elsie, head-housemaid.
 Derek Jacobi as Probert, Sir William's valet.
 Richard E. Grant as George, first footman. 
 Jeremy Swift as Arthur, footman.
 Sophie Thompson as Dorothy, still-room maid.
 Meg Wynn Owen as Lewis, lady's maid to Lady Sylvia. 
 Adrian Scarborough as Barnes, valet to  Lt. Commander Anthony Meredith.
 Ryan Phillippe as Henry Denton, American actor, posed as valet to Morris Weissman.

Frances Low and Joanna Maude play Sarah and Renee, lady's maids to, respectively, Lady Lavinia Meredith and Louisa, Lady Stockbridge. Teresa Churcher plays Bertha, a kitchen maid, while Frank Thornton makes a brief cameo as Mr Burkett, a servant in the Countess of Trentham's household.

Visitors
 Stephen Fry as Inspector Thompson
 Ron Webster as Constable Dexter

Themes
The film is a study of the British class system during the 1930s; Stephen Fry, Inspector Thompson in the film, says that it shows the upper class's dependency on a servant class. A number of secondary themes are also explored. For example, the film takes a subtle look at sexual mores during the 1930s. As it is set in 1932, between the world wars, the impact of the First World War is explored in the film's screenplay. It mentions the decline of the British Empire and the peerage system. Writing for PopMatters, Cynthia Fuchs described surface appearances, rather than complex interpersonal relationships, as a theme of the film.

Salon.com critic Steven Johnson notes a revival of the manor house mystery style, popularised by the writings of Agatha Christie, in the screenplay for Gosford Park. He called it a blend between this literary style and that of the 19th century novel. Bob Balaban, an actor and producer for Gosford Park, says that the idea of creating a murder mystery told by the servants in the manor was an interesting one for him and Altman.

Themes from the film were picked up and integrated into the series Downton Abbey by Julian Fellowes. Maggie Smith starred again in her role as a dowager countess, this time her title not being Trentham but Grantham; the family are related to the Marquess (rather than the Earl) of Flintshire.

Production

Development and writing
In 1999, Bob Balaban asked Robert Altman if there were something they could develop together, and Altman suggested a whodunit. Altman wanted to create an Agatha Christie-like country house murder mystery that explored that way of life; he called the film a "classic situation: all suspects under one roof". Altman was also inspired by the 1930s films, The Rules of the Game and Charlie Chan in London. Altman chose British actor and writer Julian Fellowes to write the screenplay, because Fellowes knew how country houses operated. Fellowes, who had never written a feature film before, received a telephone call from Altman, who asked him to come up with some characters and stories. Fellowes was given a brief outline of the film: it was to be "set in a country house in the '30s and to have a murder in there somewhere, but for it to really be an examination of class." Altman also wanted the film to explore the three groups of people: the family, the guests, and the servants. Of the call, Fellowes said, "All the way through I thought this can't be happening—a 50-year-old fat balding actor is phoned up by an American movie director—but I did work as if it was going to happen."

The original title of the film was The Other Side of the Tapestry, but Altman thought it was awkward. Fellowes began looking through some books and came up with Gosford Park. Altman said: "Nobody liked it, everyone fought me on it. But when you make a picture using a name, that's its name. It's not a gripping title. But then M*A*S*H wasn't either."

Fellowes says the screenplay was "not an homage to Agatha Christie, but a reworking of that genre." Fellowes was credited not only as the film's writer but as a technical advisor as well, meaning he wrote portions of the film as it was being produced. He notes that in certain large scenes with many characters, the actors were left room to improvise.

Arthur Inch, the retired butler of Sir Richard and Lady Kleinwort, was the consultant on correct procedures and arrangements for dining on the set. Inch is credited as "Butler" immediately before Altman as Director in the final credits. Ruth Mott was the consultant for the kitchen, and Violet Liddle for the parlour maids.

Casting
In Gosford Park, as in many of his other films, Altman had a list of actors he intended to appear in the film before it was cast formally. The film's casting director was Mary Selway, whom producer David Levy described as knowing many British actors. Very few actors who were offered parts did not end up in the film. Jude Law dropped out of the production just before the shoot began, and he was replaced by Ryan Phillippe. Kenneth Branagh and Robert Bathurst were both tied down by scheduling conflicts. Alan Rickman, Joely Richardson and Judi Dench were also considered for roles in the film. The cast is notable for featuring two knights (Michael Gambon and Derek Jacobi) and two dames (Maggie Smith and Eileen Atkins). Three other members of the cast (Alan Bates, Helen Mirren and Kristin Scott Thomas) were later elevated to that status.

Filming and editing

Filming was conducted at Wrotham Park for the exteriors, staircase, dining room and drawing room, and Syon House for the upstairs bedrooms. The opening sequence outside Lady Trentham's home was shot at Hall Barn, near Beaconsfield, Buckinghamshire, whose grounds were also used as the scene for lunch after the shoot. Sound stages were built to film the scenes of the manor's downstairs area. Shepperton Studios was used for off-location filming.

The film was shot with two cameras, both moving perpetually in opposite directions. The cameras pointed toward no specific area, intended to cause the audience to move their eyes throughout the scene. Altman notes that most of the film's cast had experience in theatre and in film, meaning they had acted in situations where the view of the audience is not on one specific actor, and each audience member sees a slightly different image of the players on stage. Richard E. Grant commented that having two cameras moving at any one time meant that none of the actors knew when the cameras were focused on them. As a result, the actors had to stay "completely in character, completely in the moment, and interact with everybody in a way that felt as close to real life as you could possibly conjure up." Andrew Dunn, the film's cinematographer, appreciated the co-operative nature of Gosford Park'''s filming process. He shot the film on Kodak Vision Expression 500T film stock generally with two Panavision cameras, using lighting ranging from relatively dim candles to bright hydrargyrum medium-arc iodide lamps. Editor Tim Squyres described the editing process on Gosford Park as an unusual one, as the dual cameras used were generally located in the same areas when filming, instead of the more standard method of setting up a scene directly.

Soundtrack

Patrick Doyle composed the film's score. Doyle said that it can take him up to six months to create a film score, but Altman asked him to write and compose the music for Gosford Park in less than five weeks. Doyle recorded the soundtrack at the London Air-Edel Recording Studios in October 2001. The soundtrack also features six original songs by composer and playwright, Ivor Novello. Jeremy Northam, who plays Novello, sings all the songs and his brother, Christopher, accompanies him on the piano. The soundtrack was released on 15 January 2002.

Release

Premiere and theatrical releaseGosford Park premiered on 7 November 2001 at the London Film Festival. The film then received a limited release across cinemas in the United States on 26 December 2001, before being widely released in January 2002 by USA Films. It was released on 1 February 2002 in the United Kingdom.

Home media
The region 1 DVD of Gosford Park was released on 25 June 2002, with the region 2 release on 3 December 2002. The critic Ed Gonzalez reviewed the DVD negatively, calling the picture quality "atrocious on the small screen", going on to say that "the image quality of this video transfer is downright lousy from start to finish." However, reviewer Robert Mack generally wrote favourably of the picture quality, noting excellence in the shots' detail and sharpness and the lack of compression artefacts, but describing an unfavourable darkness to scenes filmed within the manor house. Both reviewers commented positively on the film's score and soundtrack. Gonzalez wrote that "Gosford Park sounds amazing for a film so dialogue-dependent" and Mack that "the audio transfer is about as good as it can get on a movie of this style."

On 26 November 2018, Arrow Films released a newly restored 2K remaster, taken from a 4K print of Gosford Park, on Limited Edition Blu-ray in the UK.

Reception

Box office
In its limited release opening weekend, the film grossed $241,219, hitting No. 23 in the box office that weekend. In its wide release, it grossed $3,395,759; by the end of its run on 6 June 2002, Gosford Park grossed $41,308,615 in the domestic box office and a worldwide total of $87,754,044. With that final total, Gosford Park became Altman's second-most successful film at the box office after his 1970 film M*A*S*H.

Critical response
Review aggregator Rotten Tomatoes reports that 87% of 161 critics have given the film a positive review, with an average rating of 7.6/10. The site's critics consensus reads, "A mixture of Upstairs, Downstairs; Clue; and perceptive social commentary, Gosford Park ranks among director Altman's best." Metacritic assigned the film a weighted average score of 90 out of 100, based on 34 critics, indicating "universal acclaim."

Roger Ebert awarded it his four out of four stars, describing the story as "such a joyous and audacious achievement it deserves comparison with his [Robert Altman's] very best movies." Ebert specifically noted a quality of the film that many Altman films share: a focus on character rather than plot. Emanuel Levy gave Gosford Park an A minus rating, describing one of its themes as "illuminating a society and a way of life on the verge of extinction", placing the interwar setting as an integral part of the film's class study. However, he notes that because Altman is an independent observer of the society he portrays in the film, it does not have the biting qualities of his previous social commentaries such as Short Cuts, set in the director's home country of the United States. Jonathan Rosenbaum in the Chicago Reader called it a masterpiece.Gosford Parks cinematography was a focus of several critics. CNN's Paul Clinton praised Andrew Dunn's camera work, describing it as "lush and rich; the camera glides up and down the stairs of the grand estate, the period look is beautifully crafted." Ed Gonzalez of the online publication Slant Magazine writes that "Altman's camera is the star of Gosford Park" and that the film's cinematography is used as an aid to its storytelling. Michael Phillips placed Gosford Park at number nine on his list of Best Films of the Decade. The film was placed at 82 on Slant Magazine's list of best films of the 2000s.

Accolades and awardsGosford Park was nominated for 61 different awards following its release, winning 25 of them. There were seven nominations for Academy Awards (including Best Picture and Best Director, both of which it lost to A Beautiful Mind''); Fellowes won the Best Original Screenplay. At the 55th British Academy Film Awards, the film was nominated for nine British Academy awards, winning Best British Film and Best Costume Design (Jenny Beavan). Mirren, Smith and Watson were all nominated for Best European Actress at the European Film Awards. The film received five nominations at the 59th Golden Globe Awards; Altman won the Award for 'Best Director'.

At the 8th Screen Actors Guild Awards Mirren won 'Outstanding Performance by a Female Actor in a Supporting Role' and the ensemble cast collectively won 'Outstanding Performance by a Cast in a Motion Picture'. The film won four more 'Best Cast' awards from the Broadcast Film Critics Association, Florida Film Critics Circle, and Online Film Critics Society. Fellowes received recognition for the film's screenplay from the Writers Guild of America, where he won the Best Original Screenplay award. The film's score composer, Patrick Doyle, received two nominations for his work. Doyle was nominated for Composer of the Year from the American Film Institute and he won the award for Soundtrack Composer of the Year from the World Soundtrack Awards.

References

External links

 
 
 
 

2001 films
BAFTA winners (films)
Best British Film BAFTA Award winners
British mystery films
Downton Abbey
2000s English-language films
Films directed by Robert Altman
Fictional houses
Films set in 1932
Films set in country houses
Films about the upper class
Films set in England
Films shot in England
Films whose director won the Best Director Golden Globe
Films whose writer won the Best Original Screenplay Academy Award
Films with screenplays by Julian Fellowes
Films scored by Patrick Doyle
Ivor Novello
2000s British films